Sansa Framework is a structure to create PHP web applications using the model–view–controller (MVC) model, it's a web application that must be installed in a server to work, could be installed in a test server or in production server. The developer must create a data model and do all the changes the project need and at any time generate the model. The generation creates a database in MySQL server with the same name of the model and a n-tier layer of libraries to handle the database.

To insert a new record to the table, create a new instance of a class, fill the properties and call the insert method. 
$usr = new users();
$usr->name = "test";
$usr->insert();
The code above insert one record to the table users with the name test.
$usr = new users();
if ($usr->get("name")->where("id=1")->exe()) {
    if ($usr->count > 0) {
        foreach ($usr->dobj as $d) {
            echo $d->name . "<br>";
        }
    }
}
The code above print test.
$usr = new users(1);
echo $usr->name;
The code above print test too.

Complex code:

public function save($arr)
{
    $result = false;
    $this->arr_to_prop($arr); //this method clear the array of risky code and 
    //assign $this->name = $arr['mappname'] and any other property.
    $index = $arr['index'];
    if ($index == 0) {                // new
        $result = $this->insert();
    } else {                        // edit
        if (isset($_SESSION['dusers'])) {
            $id = $_SESSION['dusers'][$index]['id']
            $result = $this->update($id);
        }
    }
    return $result;
}

The code below shows how to create joins.

require($_SERVER['DOCUMENT_ROOT'] . '/layers/bll/users.php');
require($_SERVER['DOCUMENT_ROOT'] . '/layers/bll/rights.php');
require($_SERVER['DOCUMENT_ROOT'] . '/layers/bll/access.php');

$u = new users();

if ($u->join($r = new rights())->on(array($u->rightid(), EQUAL, $r->id()))
     ->join($a = new access())->on(array($r->idaccess(), EQUAL, $a->aid()))
     ->get(array($u->name(), $r->rname(), $a->aname()))
     ->exe()) {
    // echo $u->sqlstr . "<br><br>"; // print the resulting sql if you need it.
    foreach ($u->dobj as $d) {
        echo $d->name . " " . $d->rname . " " . $d->aname . "<br>";
    }
}

External links
 The Sansa Framework website

PHP frameworks